Netherlands Antilles national under-20 football team represented the former Netherlands Antilles in international football competitions such as FIFA U-20 World Cup and CONCACAF Caribbean Championship.

Overview

Notable players
   Lisandro Trenidad
   Leandro Bacuna
   Bryan Anastatia
   Elson Hooi
   Hubertson Pauletta

Caribbean national under-20 association football teams
Under-20